A Sombra de Rebecca is a Brazilian telenovela produced and broadcast by TV Globo. It premiered on 21 February 1967 and ended on 23 June 1967, with a total of 90 episodes. It's the third "novela das oito" to be aired on the timeslot.

It is written by Glória Magadan, based on the opera Madama Butterfly.

Cast

References

External links 
 

TV Globo telenovelas
1967 Brazilian television series debuts
1967 Brazilian television series endings
1967 telenovelas
Brazilian telenovelas
Portuguese-language telenovelas